Jackson Burke (1908 in San Francisco, California – 1975) was an American type and book designer. After studying at the University of California, Berkeley, he succeeded C.H. Griffith as Director of Typographic Development at Mergenthaler Linotype from 1949 until 1963, where he designed several type faces.

He was also responsible for a number of other achievements at Mergenthaler-Linotype including:

 development of fonts for Native American languages
 development of the TeleTypesetting System (TTS) for magazine use
 development and implementation of the first phase of Linotype Group's photocomposition library

With his wife Mary Griggs Burke (1916–2012) he was a noted collector of Japanese art; by the time of her death, the collection had become the largest private collection of Japanese art outside Japan. The couple did not have children, and on her death in 2012 their collection was divided between the Metropolitan Museum of Art in New York City and the Minneapolis Institute of Arts.

Type Faces
 Trade Gothic series (Linotype), considered by some to be a knock-off of Morris Fuller Benton's News Gothic.
 Trade Gothic Condensed + Bold (1948)
 Trade Gothic Extra Condensed + Bold (1948)
 Trade Gothic + Bold (1955)
 Trade Gothic Extended + Bold (1959)
 Trade Gothic Light + Italic (1962)
 Majestic + Bold (1955, Linotype), some sources credit this face to Burke, while others simply list it as being created by "staff designers".
 Aurora + Italic (1960, Linotype), only made in 8.5 point.

References

External links
 Mary and Jackson Burke Foundation - link
The Mary Griggs Burke Collection, comprehensive online catalogue of The Mary Griggs Burke Collection
Bridge of dreams: the Mary Griggs Burke collection of Japanese art, a catalogue from The Metropolitan Museum of Art Libraries (fully available online as PDF)

1908 births
1975 deaths
American typographers and type designers